Christopher Rene (previously René; born December 25, 1982) is an American singer-songwriter, musician and producer. He was in a band called Diversion and also had a solo career, releasing the album Soul'd Out. Chris auditioned for the first season of The X Factor USA with one of his original compositions "Young Homie" and was one of the finalists during season one, with L.A. Reid as his mentor. He finished third overall in the competition, behind winner Melanie Amaro and runner-up Josh Krajcik. He is most popular in New Zealand, with his single "Young Homie" reaching number one in the New Zealand charts. He is also notorious for alienating half of his fanbase back In 2019 with a post allegedly from his manager saying he doesn’t care to listen to his fans “problems”

Early life
Christopher Rene was born to Joan René (née Sampson) and Rafael Leon "Googie" René. His father was a songwriter and jazz pianist in the 1950s and 1960s. He has two brothers, Mike and Gabriel, and a sister, Gina. Gina is a singer featured on the Mean Girls and Step Up soundtracks, Gabriel is a record producer, and both are members of an electronica group called Soulstice. Rene's ethnicity is Creole, German, African-American, Native-American, and Swiss.

Prior to applying for The X Factor, Rene worked hauling trash in Santa Cruz, where he currently lives. A heavily tattooed man, he has a tattoo that reads "Believe" on his arm, and the tattoos "Love" and "Life" on his fingers. Rene says, "I've been influenced by every kind of music you can think of, from Mozart to Led Zeppelin to Outkast. I love Al Green, I love punk rock—just anything that's got that crazy passion."

Music career

1993–2002: Diversion
Diversion was Rene's first musical alliance; it was an alternative pop band based in Soquel, California (1994–2002) composed of Tas Szemeredi (vox/bass), Chris Rene (guitar/vox), and Mike Rene (drums). They were only 12 or 13 years old when they formed the band, but still performed at well-known venues such as the Red Room.

The group released a self-titled CD, Diversion, in 2000. The band recorded more tracks for a second album, but they broke up in early 2005 without being able to finish it.

2003–2009: Solo career
The band continued working on music for their second album until 2005, but never saw the project through. After the split-up of the band, Rene began writing and recording music as an individual. He continued to work as a solo artist and in 2009 released the album Soul'd Out on an independent label.

2011: The X Factor

On September 21, 2011, Rene auditioned by singing one of his original songs, entitled "Young Homie", getting a standing ovation from the audience and four "yeses" from the judges. During the competition, he performed two of his original compositions (lyrics and music). They were "Young Homie" (during auditions, week 5 of the live shows and his performance in the final) and "Where Do We Go from Here" (in week 7 of the live shows, on December 7, 2011). He also sang a mix of "Let It Be"/"Young Homie" on November 22, 2011 in Week 5 of the live shows of the series, and also in the finale of the show.

Performances on The X Factor

2012–present: After The X Factor
L.A. Reid has confirmed that Rene has started recording music for a post-The X Factor album.

On January 17, 2012, it was confirmed that Rene had signed with a joint venture between Syco and Epic Records, a division of Sony Music Entertainment.

Rene re-recorded his original song "Young Homie", which was made available on iTunes on March 13, 2012.

Rene shot the music video for the song on February 16, 2012 in his hometown of Santa Cruz, California, and it was released on YouTube and Vevo on March 20, 2012. The song was confirmed to be the lead single of his debut album.

On May 22, 2012 Rene performed "Young Homie" at the first Q102 Springle Ball 2012 concert.

Rene's debut EP, I'm Right Here, was released on October 2, 2012. In June 2016 he announced that a new single "Let It Crack" is on its way.

Rene has made several appearances on television singing his own music. Additionally, after a hiatus from social media, Rene returned to the platforms in late 2018.

Rene released an independent EP, "2020", on April 21, 2020.

Personal life
Rene is a drug addict and alcoholic, who revealed he had just been out of rehab at Janus Rehabilitation Center of Santa Cruz, and had been clean for just ten weeks before taking part in The X Factor auditions. His song "Young Homie" is "about learning how to be a grown-up," says Rene. "When you're young, you feel like there's no limit, no consequences to your actions. So it's me talking to my younger self and to all the young brothers out there, telling them that life's too beautiful to live like that." While the song contains a heavy subject, it is reflective of Rene's personal life.

Rene plays piano, guitar, bass, drums, among others. He began writing songs and playing guitar at age 12, teaching himself the pentatonic scale and beyond.

Rene has a son, Ryan (born August 30, 2008). He also has another son, Elijah. For the first two years of Elijah's life, Rene did not know about him. Elijah has since been adopted by a family in Santa Cruz and Chris has been included in that adopted family and visits regularly.

Rene is the grandson of Leon René, a famous composer of R&B and rock and roll songs in the 1930s, 1940s, and 1950s and a founder of a number of record labels including Class and Rendezvous Record Company. He is also famous for writing "Rockin' Robin", a hit for Bobby Day and for Michael Jackson.

Discography

Soul'd Out (2009)
I'm Right Here (2012)

References

External links 
Chris Rene Music
Chris Rene YouTube
MTV listing

1982 births
American hip hop musicians
Epic Records artists
Living people
Louisiana Creole people
Musicians from Santa Cruz, California
The X Factor (American TV series) contestants
Singer-songwriters from California
People from Soquel, California
21st-century American singers